George Pomeroy Goodale (April 12, 1843 – May 7, 1919) was the drama editor of The Detroit Free Press.

Biography
He was born on April 12, 1843 in Orleans, New York to Elijah Goodale and Mary E. Palmer. He served in the American Civil War and became the drama editor of The Detroit Free Press in 1865.

He died on May 7, 1919 in Royal Oak Charter Township, Michigan.

References

1843 births
1919 deaths
Detroit Free Press people